George Henry Pitt (1 December 1872 – 16 April 1932) was an Australian politician.

He was born in Longford, Tasmania. In 1920 he was elected to the Tasmanian Legislative Council as the independent member for Macquarie. He served until his death in Launceston in 1932.

References

1872 births
1932 deaths
Independent members of the Parliament of Tasmania
Members of the Tasmanian Legislative Council
20th-century Australian politicians